IZA World of Labor is an open access resource providing evidence-based research. It is run by the Institute for the Study of Labor (IZA) in partnership with Bloomsbury Publishing.

Overview 
IZA World of Labor launched on 1 May 2014 at the Press Club in Washington D.C. to coincide with International Workers' Day. It is a freely-available online resource presenting analyses of labor economics issues to inform evidence-based policy, from the effect of minimum wages on employment prospects to whether demographic bulges affect youth unemployment. Each peer-reviewed article is structured in a uniform format: pros and cons to demonstrate an objective view of current debates; a map showing where in the world the research has come from; data sources; and a one-page compact summary which offers quick, key facts.
 
The website and articles are divided into ten key areas of study: program evaluation; behavioral and personnel economics; migration; institutions; transition and emerging economies; development; environment; education and human capital; demography, family, and gender; and data and methods. The editor-in-chief is Daniel S. Hamermesh, Professor in Economics, Royal Holloway University of London and Sue Killam Professor Emeritus in the Foundation of Economics at the University of Texas at Austin.

Subject areas

Abstracting and indexing 
Articles are indexed in EconLit and RepEc.

Partnerships and events 
IZA World of Labor has collaborated with the World Bank, OECD, London School of Economics, and CEMFI to organise policy workshops.

Press and media 
Articles have received international coverage, with features in UK outlets such as the Daily Telegraph, The Independent, and Metro; German newspapers such as Die Welt; and South American press such as Peru 21, JC Magazine, and El Correo.

References

External links 

2014 establishments in Germany
Economics websites
Internet properties established in 2014
Labour economics